Konstantinos Mangos (born 18 November 1976) is a retired Greek football midfielder.

References

1976 births
Living people
Greek footballers
OFI Crete F.C. players
GAS Ialysos 1948 F.C. players
Athlitiki Enosi Larissa F.C. players
Proodeftiki F.C. players
Ionikos F.C. players
PAS Giannina F.C. players
Vyzas F.C. players
Olympiacos Volos F.C. players
Pierikos F.C. players
Tyrnavos 2005 F.C. players
Pyrgetos F.C. players
Haravgi Larissa F.C. players
Association football midfielders
Super League Greece players
Footballers from Larissa